A grama (Talmudic Aramaic: גרמא) in Halacha (Jewish law) is something that was indirectly caused by something else but which outcome is not guaranteed.

A classic example given to this is of vases that are filled with water and put around a fire in order to extinguish it. This is allowed on Shabbat because it is indirect and because the fire might not extinguish.

In civil law
There is a rule that grama benizakin patur. If somebody caused financial harm to somebody else via an action that was not guaranteed to harm them, the person cannot be forced by a court to pay, although he might be morally obligated to.

On Shabbat
An action which indirectly causes a Shabbat violation due to grama has a lower level of prohibition than an action which violates Shabbat directly. In situations of great need, a grama violation can be permitted.

Based on this, a variety of electrical devices have been developed which violate Shabbat only through grama, and thus can be used in situations of great need, for example in health care or security.

See also 
 Shabbat mode
 Pikuach nefesh

References 

Jewish law principles
Talmud concepts and terminology
Aramaic words and phrases